JuJu is the fifth album by American jazz saxophonist Wayne Shorter. It was released in July 1965 by Blue Note Records. It features a rhythm section of pianist McCoy Tyner, bassist Reggie Workman and drummer Elvin Jones, all of whom had worked extensively with Shorter's fellow tenor saxophonist John Coltrane.

Writing a retrospective review in AllMusic, Stacia Proefrock avers that the use of Coltrane's rhythm section "bolstered" criticism that Shorter was "a mere acolyte of John Coltrane". Proefrock goes on to say that "The truth is, though, that Elvin Jones, Reggie Workman, and McCoy Tyner were the perfect musicians to back Shorter." Proefrock concludes that the album "blooms with ideas, pulling in a world of influences and releasing them again as a series of stunning, complete visions."

Track listing
All pieces written by Shorter.

Side One

"JuJu" – 8:30
"Deluge" – 6:49
"House of Jade" – 6:49

Side Two

"Mahjong" – 7:39
"Yes or No" – 6:34
"Twelve More Bars to Go" – 5:26

Alternative takes on reissue
"JuJu" – 7:48
"House of Jade" – 6:37

Personnel
Wayne Shorter – tenor saxophone
McCoy Tyner – piano
Reggie Workman – bass
Elvin Jones – drums

References

External links
JuJu (RVG edition) – Blue Note site

1965 albums
Blue Note Records albums
Wayne Shorter albums
Albums produced by Alfred Lion
Albums recorded at Van Gelder Studio